Norman Eagleson Shore (August 16, 1887 – April 4, 1964) was a Canadian professional ice hockey player. He played three games for the Portland Rosebuds of the Pacific Coast Hockey Association in the 1914–15 season.

References

External links
Statistics

1887 births
1964 deaths
Ice hockey people from Ottawa
Portland Rosebuds players
Canadian ice hockey defencemen